A  is a fashion accessory used for holding up the long sleeves of the Japanese kimono. It is a sash made from either cloth or cord that loops over each shoulder and crosses over the wearer's back. The bottom of the kimono sleeves can then be tucked into the loop, holding them back for convenience and functionality.

Overview 

In modern Japanese history,  were used by many people as everyday practical accessories, but in ancient Japan they were an exclusive accessory used by the Shinto clergy during ceremonies.

Terracotta Haniwa dating to the Kofun period that were excavated in Gunma Prefecture depict Shinto  wearing .

During the Edo period (1603-1867),  were worn by manual laborers for the mobility they would have had if they were not wearing kimono. The  allowed the kimono wearer to work without large sleeves getting in the way of the job, and without risking damage to the garment's sleeves.

 are still used for both practical and aesthetic reasons even for modern wearers of Kimono.

As many  and  festivals are held outside during the summer,  also help the wearer keep cool while they work.

 motorcycle gang members wear  for aesthetic reasons, as a part of their , an attempt to imitate WWII kamikaze pilots.

See also 
 List of items traditionally worn in Japan
 Sleeve garter

References

External links
How to tie

Fashion
Japanese sashes
Fashion accessories
History of Asian clothing
Shinto religious objects